Enrico "Ricky" Albertosi (born 2 November 1939) is an Italian former footballer who played as a goalkeeper. Regarded as one of Italy's greatest ever goalkeepers, he had a successful club career, winning titles with Fiorentina, Cagliari, and Milan, before retiring with Elpidiense. He also played for the Italy national team in the 1966 World Cup and the 1970 World Cup, in which Italy reached the final, as well as being a member of the Italy teams that took part in the 1962 and 1974 World Cups. Albertosi was also included in the Italy squad that won the 1968 European Championship.

Club career
Born in Pontremoli, at club youth level, Albertosi represented the Spezia youth academy for a season, before making his debut in Serie A at the age of 18 for Fiorentina on 18 January 1959, playing in a goalless draw with A.S. Roma. Despite heavy competition from Giuliano Sarti during his first five seasons at the Tuscan club, where he initially mainly served as a back-up, Albertosi represented Fiorentina until 1968, winning a Mitropa Cup in 1966, a European Cup Winners' Cup in 1961 (the first ever edition of the competition), and 2 Coppa Italia trophies in 1961 and 1966. He later transferred to Luigi Riva's side, Cagliari Calcio, where he helped to win Cagliari's legendary first and only Scudetto during the 1969–70 season, his second season with the Sardinian club, recording what was at the time the lowest number of goals conceded in a 16-team Serie A campaign. He later transferred to A.C. Milan in 1974, where he remained for six years, and he won yet another Serie A championship medal with the club during the 1978–79 season, along with another Coppa Italia during the 1976–77 season. With 233 appearances for the club, he is Milan's fifth-most capped keeper of all time, behind only Christian Abbiati (380), Sebastiano Rossi (330), Dida (302), and Lorenzo Buffon (300).

Albertosi was involved with the Italian "Totonero" betting scandal of 1980 and was ultimately suspended for 2 seasons. After Italy won the 1982 World Cup in Spain, the Italian football federation decided to let him play again. He ended his career in 1984, after playing two seasons with Elpidiense in Serie C2, at the age of 44. With 532 Serie A appearances, he is the 10th-highest appearance holder of all time in Serie A.

International career
Albertosi made his debut for the Italy national team on 15 September 1961, in a 4–1 friendly victory against Argentina in Florence, under manager Giovanni Ferrari. His final international game took place in June 1972, when Italy drew 1–1 in a friendly match with Bulgaria, held in Sofia.

Under new manager Edmondo Fabbri, Albertosi became a regular in Italy's squad; he played his first World Cup with Italy in England 1966, where they were surprisingly and disappointingly knocked out in the first round. In the 1970 World Cup in Mexico, Albertosi was once again named Italy's starting goalkeeper, due to his excellent and consistent performances throughout the season with Cagliari. He started in all of Italy's matches, and was involved in the so-called "Game of the Century", when Italy played West Germany in the semi-final of the tournament; despite conceding three goals in this match, and some moments of hesitation and indecisiveness, Albertosi later won praise for a string of decisive acrobatic saves. He is also remembered for berating Gianni Rivera during the match, following the playmaker's error when defending a set-piece, which led to Germany's equaliser: Rivera briefly stepped away from the post, leaving it unmarked, and allowing Gerd Müller to score his second goal to tie the match at 3–3 in the 110th minute; Rivera later redeemed himself by scoring the match-winner a minute later. Albertosi later appeared in the 1970 World Cup Final, where Italy became tournament runners-up as they lost 4–1 to Brazil.

Albertosi was also an unused squad member in the 1962 World Cup in Chile under Ferrari, behind Lorenzo Buffon and Carlo Mattrel, and at the 1974 World Cup, behind his perceived career rival Dino Zoff, with whom he often faced competition for the Italy number 1 shirt due to the coaches' rotation policy. Albertosi was similarly an unused back-up goalkeeper behind Zoff at the 1968 European Football Championship, which Italy won on home soil, although he later managed to fight off competition from Zoff for a place in the starting line-up at the 1970 World Cup. He missed out on a place as Italy's third goalkeeper at the 1978 FIFA World Cup, however. In total, he played 34 times for the national team between 1961 and 1972.

Style of play
Albertosi was a physically strong, eccentric, whimsical, and athletic goalkeeper, with a hot temper; he is regarded as one of the greatest and most spectacular Italian goalkeepers of all time and one of the best of his generation, due to his outstanding technical and physical attributes. An extroverted footballer, he was an efficient yet creative goalkeeper, who was known in particular for his reactions, speed, agility, and ability to produce decisive, acrobatic and spectacular saves; however, in spite of his reputation, longevity, and general consistency, at times he was also criticised for his poor work-rate and mentality throughout his career, as well as his humorous, light-hearted and undisciplined character, which occasionally had a negative impact on the consistency of his performances.

Honours

Club
Fiorentina
Coppa Italia: 1960–61, 1965–66
UEFA Cup Winners' Cup: 1960–61
Mitropa Cup: 1966

Cagliari
Serie A: 1969–70

Milan
Serie A: 1978–79
Coppa Italia: 1976–77

International
Italy
FIFA World Cup: Runner-up: 1970
UEFA European Football Championship: 1968

Individual
Fiorentina Hall of Fame: 2018

References

External links 
 Profile
 RSSSF statistics for Enrico Albertosi for the national team

1939 births
A.C. Milan players
Cagliari Calcio players
1962 FIFA World Cup players
1966 FIFA World Cup players
1970 FIFA World Cup players
1974 FIFA World Cup players
ACF Fiorentina players
Association football goalkeepers
Italian footballers
Italy international footballers
Living people
Serie A players
Serie C players
Serie D players
Spezia Calcio players
UEFA Euro 1968 players
UEFA European Championship-winning players
Sportspeople from the Province of Massa-Carrara
Footballers from Tuscany